Cal Neva or Calneva may refer to:

Club Cal Neva in Reno, Nevada
Cal Neva Lodge & Casino in Crystal Bay, Nevada
Calneva, California

See also
Cal-Nev-Ari, Nevada